The 27th Mieczysław Połukard Criterium of Polish Speedway League Aces was the 2008 version of the Mieczysław Połukard Criterium of Polish Speedway Leagues Aces. It took place on March 30 in the Polonia Stadium in Bydgoszcz, Poland.

Starting positions draw 

  Tomasz Gollob - Stal Gorzów Wlkp.
  Krzysztof Buczkowski - Polonia Bydgoszcz
  Sławomir Drabik - Złomrex Włókniarz Częstochowa
  Damian Baliński - Unia Leszno
  Andreas Jonsson - Polonia Bydgoszcz
  Wiesław Jaguś - Unibax Toruń
  Daniel Jeleniewski - Atlas Wrocław
  Martin Smolinski - GTŻ Grudziądz
  Rafał Okoniewski - Polonia Bydgoszcz
  Krzysztof Kasprzak - Unia Leszno
  Luboš Tomíček, Jr. - Kolejarz Opole
  Emil Sayfutdinov - Polonia Bydgoszcz
  Tomasz Chrzanowski - Lotos Gdańsk
  Ryan Sullivan - Unibax Toruń
  Tomasz Jędrzejak - Atlas Wrocław
  Jonas Davidsson - Polonia Bydgoszcz
  Marcin Jędrzejewski - Polonia Bydgoszcz
  Michał Łopaczewski - Polonia Bydgoszcz

Note: riders in bold type was Polonia' riders.

Heat details 
{{Speedway event 20heats|RIDERS=

{{Speedway event 20heats/rider|2|12|RUS|Emil Sayfutdinov||3|3|3|2|2|PL=BYD}}

}}

 Heat after heat 
 (65, 47) Baliński, Gollob, Buczkowski, Drabik
 (65,49) Jonsson, Smolinski, Jeleniewski, Jaguś
 (64,75) Saifutdinov, Kasprzak, Okoniewski, Tomíček
 (64,97) Chrzanowski, Jędrzejak, Davidsson, Sullivan
 (65,82) Gollob, Jonsson, Chrzanowski, Okoniewski
 (64,64) Jaguś''', Sullivan, Kasprzak, Buczkowski
 (65,25) Drabik, Jędrzejak, Tomíček, Jeleniewski
 (65,59) Saifutdinov, Baliński, Davidsson, Smolinski
 (66,77) Gollob, Jaguś, Davidsson, Tomíček
 (66,15) Saifutdinov, Jędrzejak, Jonsson, Buczkowski
 (65,96) Sullivan, Okoniewski, Drabik, Smolinski
 (66,07) Chrzanowski, Kasprzak, Jeleniewski, Baliński
 (66,34) Gollob, Saifutdinov, Sullivan, Jeleniewski
 (66,95) Chrzanowski, Buczkowski, Tomíček, Smolinski
 (66,36) Kasprzak, Davidsson, Jonsson, Drabik
 (65,84) Okoniewski, Jędrzejak, Jaguś, Baliński
 (68,18) Gollob, Kasprzak, Jędrzejak, Smolinski
 (67,03) Davidsson, Buczkowski, Okoniewski, Jeleniewski
 (66,46) Jaguś, Saifutdinov, Chrzanowski, Drabik
 (66,40) Baliński, Tomíček, Jonsson, Sullivan

Sources 
 Polonia.Bydgoszcz.pl

See also 

Criterium of Aces
Mieczysław Połukard Criterium of Polish Speedway Leagues Aces